Women Make Film is a documentary film by the British-Irish filmmaker and film critic Mark Cousins. The film premiered on 1 September 2018 at the Venice Film Festival, and was released on the BFI Player in May 2020.

The film is divided into 40 chapters over 14 hours and features the work of 183 directors.

In the 1990s, Cousins curated a season of documentary films and realised later he had only included a single film made by a woman. This got him interested in finding and highlighting women filmmakers from around the world and throughout film history, eventually leading to the creation of this documentary. The premise of the film is that it is not about women filmmakers or institutional sexism; rather it is a documentary about film itself, and it explores 40 different aspects of filmmaking, drawing from a wide range of films as examples, all of which are made by women.

The academic Laura Mulvey curated the inaugural Women's Film Event at the Edinburgh film festival in 1972, the blurb for their event stated that "A festival of men's films would be simply absurd. It's because so few women have been able to make films that this festival exists". Mulvey said of Women Make Film that "The amazing extent of the work, with over a thousand clips, has the potential to bring women directors out of gender categorisation and into film history as such. But it also offers an unprecedented opportunity to enjoy women's cinematic vision and reflect on the way women have seen and indeed made the world through film – a source of wonder and of speculation!"

The documentary is narrated by Adjoa Andoh, Jane Fonda, Kerry Fox, Thandiwe Newton, Tilda Swinton, Sharmila Tagore and Debra Winger.

The Birds' Eye View charity will host weekly viewing parties and Facebook Live responses and debates on the documentary from women filmmakers for audiences at home during the COVID-19 pandemic lockdowns.

List of chapters

Introductions
 We Were Young  – Binka Zhelyazkova
 You and Me  – Larisa Shepitko
 On the 12th Day of Christmas  – Wendy Toye
 Brief Encounters  – Kira Muratova

Openings
 The East Is Red  – Wang Ping
 First Comes Courage  – Dorothy Arzner
 The Silences of the Palace  – Moufida Tlatli
 Strange Days  – Kathryn Bigelow
 Harlan County U.S.A.  – Barbara Kopple
 Innocence  – Lucile Hadžihalilović
 Things to Come  – Mia Hansen-Løve
 Je Tu Il Elle  – Chantal Akerman
 All for Mary  – Wendy Toye
 Sweetie  – Jane Campion
 Thumbelina  – Lotte Reiniger
 Le Bonheur  – Agnès Varda
 The Very Late Afternoon of a Faun  – Věra Chytilová
 The Black Dog  – Alison de Vere
 The 3 Rooms of Melancholia  – Pirjo Honkasalo
 The Day I Became a Woman  – Marziyeh Meshkini
 Blackboards  – Samira Makhmalbaf
 Attenberg  – Athina Rachel Tsangari
 Be My Star  – Valeska Grisebach
 The Visitor  – Lola Randl
 A Time to Die  – Dorota Kędzierzawska
 Butter on the Latch  – Josephine Decker
 The Last Stage  – Wanda Jakubowska
 La Cienaga  – Lucrecia Martel

Tone
 Merrily We Go to Hell  – Dorothy Arzner
 Wanda  – Barbara Loden
 Pet Sematary  – Mary Lambert
 Tank Girl  – Rachel Talalay
 On the 12th Day of Christmas  – Wendy Toye
 By the Sea  – Angelina Jolie
 Peel  – Jane Campion
 Beau Travail  – Claire Denis
 Olivia  – Jacqueline Audry
 Maedchen in Uniform  – Leontine Sagan
 Two in One  – Kira Muratova
 American Psycho  – Mary Harron
 A New Leaf  – Elaine May
 Betoniyö  – Pirjo Honkasalo

Believability
 Why Is Frau B Happy?  – Erika Runge
 The Hurt Locker  – Kathryn Bigelow
 El Camino  – Ana Mariscal
 Lore  – Cate Shortland
 Which Would You Choose?  – Dinara Asanova
 Meek's Cutoff  – Kelly Reichardt
 Hedi Schneider Is Stuck  – Sonja Heiss
 Which Would You Choose?  – Dinara Asanova
 Toni Erdmann  – Maren Ade
 Point Break  – Kathryn Bigelow
 The Blot  – Lois Weber
 Frozen River  – Courtney Hunt
 Selma  – Ava DuVernay
 Not a Pretty Picture  – Martha Coolidge
 The Apple  – Samira Makhmalbaf

Introducing a Character
 The Moon Has Risen  – Kinuyo Tanaka
 Germany, Pale Mother  – Helma Sanders-Brahms
 Somewhere  – Sofia Coppola
 Nana  – Valérie Massadian
 The Connection  – Shirley Clarke
 The Watermelon Woman  – Cheryl Dunye
 Wayne's World  – Penelope Spheeris
 Fish Tank  – Andrea Arnold
 Girlhood  – Céline Sciamma
 Toni Erdmann  – Maren Ade
 The Story of the Flaming Years  – Yuliya Solntseva

Meet Cute
 Krane's Confectionery  – Astrid Henning-Jensen
 Brief Encounters  – Kira Muratova
 The Seashell and the Clergyman  – Germaine Dulac
 The Heartbreak Kid  – Elaine May
 Grand Central  – Rebecca Zlotowski
 One. Two. One  – Mania Akbari
 The Visitor  – Lola Randl
 A Girl Walks Home Alone at Night  – Ana Lily Amirpour
 Yakshagaanam  – Sheela
 Wanda  – Barbara Loden
 Vagabond  – Agnès Varda
 Fleeting Loves  – Malvina Ursianu
 Kill Me (Tote Mich)  – Emily Atef
 Faithless  – Liv Ullmann

Conversation
 Places in Cities  – Angela Schanelec
 Middle of Nowhere  – Ava DuVernay
 Girlhood  – Céline Sciamma
 One Sings, the Other Doesn't  – Agnès Varda
 Loving Couples  – Mai Zetterling
 The Arch  – Cecile Tang
 A Girl Walks Home Alone at Night  – Ana Lily Amirpour
 The Virgin Suicides  – Sofia Coppola
 By the Sea  – Angelina Jolie
 Together  – Lorenza Mazzetti
 Sparsh  – Sai Paranjpye
 Come Early Morning  – Joey Lauren Adams
 Germany, Pale Mother  – Helma Sanders-Brahms
 The Attached Balloon  – Binka Zhelyazkova
 The Arbor  – Clio Barnard
 Harlan County U.S.A.  – Barbara Kopple
 The 3 Rooms of Melancholia  – Pirjo Honkasalo
 Tomboy  – Céline Sciamma

Framing
 One Sings, the Other Doesn't  – Agnès Varda
 Lourdes  – Jessica Hausner
 The Holy Girl  – Lucrecia Martel
 Wanda  – Barbara Loden
 Something Different  – Věra Chytilová
 Diary for My Children  – Márta Mészáros
 The Hitch-Hiker  – Ida Lupino
 The Arch  – Cecile Tang
 The Cave of the Yellow Dog  – Byambasuren Davaa
 Blue Steel  – Kathryn Bigelow
 The Last Stage  – Wanda Jakubowska
 Stefan Zweig: Farewell to Europe  – Maria Schrader
 Hard, Fast and Beautiful  – Ida Lupino
 A New Leaf  – Elaine May
 Something Different  – Věra Chytilová
 Ellen  – Mahalia Belo
 Outrage  – Ida Lupino
 Olympia Part Two: Festival of Beauty  – Leni Riefenstahl
 Olympia Part One: Festival of the Nations  – Leni Riefenstahl
 Le Bonheur  – Agnès Varda
 Marseille  – Angela Schanelec
 Surname Viet Given Name Nam  – Trinh T. Minh-ha
 La Pointe Courte  – Agnès Varda

Tracking
 Face  – Antonia Bird
 La Pointe Courte  – Agnès Varda
 Outrage  – Ida Lupino
 Home  – Ursula Meier
 Wayne's World  – Penelope Spheeris
 Anna's Summer  – Jeanine Meerapfel
 Le Lit  – Marion Hänsel
 D'Est  – Chantal Akerman

Staging
 The Moon Has Risen  – Kinuyo Tanaka
 Toni Erdmann  – Maren Ade
 Two in One  – Kira Muratova
 Girlhood  – Céline Sciamma
 Unrelated  – Joanna Hogg
 I, the Worst of All  – María Luisa Bemberg
 The Enchanted Desna  – Yuliya Solntseva
 Faces Places  – Agnès Varda and JR
 The Girls  – Mai Zetterling
 Stefan Zweig: Farewell to Europe  – Maria Schrader

Journey
 The Enchanted Desna  – Yuliya Solntseva
 Thumbelina  – Lotte Reiniger
 Nana  – Valérie Massadian
 The Asthenic Syndrome  – Kira Muratova
 The Sealed Soil  – Marva Nabili
 Mikey and Nicky  – Elaine May
 Krane's Confectionery (Kranens Konditori)  – Astrid Henning-Jensen
 Course à la saucisse  – Alice Guy-Blaché
 Love Letter  – Kinuyo Tanaka
 Point Break  – Kathryn Bigelow
 Something New  – Nell Shipman
 American Honey  – Andrea Arnold
 The Loveless  – Kathryn Bigelow, Monty Montgomery
 Rain (lluvia)  – Paula Hernández
 The Babadook  – Jennifer Kent
 35 Shots of Rum  – Claire Denis
 Certain Women  – Kelly Reichardt
 The Cave of the Yellow Dog  – Byambasuren Davaa

Discovery
 Treeless Mountain  – So Yong Kim
 Evolution  – Lucile Hadžihalilović
 Big  – Penny Marshall
 Avenue de L'Opera  – Alice Guy-Blaché
 Diary for My Children  – Márta Mészáros
 Tomboy  – Céline Sciamma
 The Seashell and the Clergyman  – Germaine Dulac
 Eternal Breasts  – Kinuyo Tanaka
 Wonder Woman  – Patty Jenkins
 The Hurt Locker  – Kathryn Bigelow
 Silent Waters  – Sabiha Sumar
 Walking in the Land of the Old  – Marianne Ahrne
 Mr Pascal  – Alison de Vere
 Dreams of a Life  – Carol Morley

Adult/Child
 The Story of a Weeping Camel  – Byambasuren Davaa and Luigi Falomi
 Home  – Ursula Meier
 The Hurt Locker  – Kathryn Bigelow
 A Real Young Girl  – Catherine Breillat
 Sister  – Ursula Meier
 Germany, Pale Mother  – Helma Sanders-Brahms
 Night Games  – Mai Zetterling
 Melody for a Street Organ  – Kira Muratova
 Winter's Bone  – Debra Granik
 The Owl Who Married a Goose  – Caroline Leaf
 Lore  – Cate Shortland
 Frozen River  – Courtney Hunt
 Mossane  – Safi Faye
 XXY  – Lucía Puenzo
 We Need to Talk About Kevin  – Lynne Ramsay
 Sherrybaby  – Laurie Collyer
 When Shooting a Film  – Xhanfize Keko
 A Portrait of Ga  – Margaret Tait

Economy
 Evolution  – Lucile Hadžihalilović
 Innocence  – Lucile Hadžihalilović
 I, the Worst of All  – María Luisa Bemberg
 Beau Travail  – Claire Denis
 The Eternal Breasts  – Kinuyo Tanaka
 One Sings, the Other Doesn't  – Agnès Varda
 Be My Star  – Valeska Grisebach
 Vagabond  – Agnès Varda
 Appropriate Behavior  – Desiree Akhavan

Editing
 Middle of Nowhere  – Ava DuVernay
 Sambizanga  – Sarah Maldoror
 Olympia Part Two: Festival of Beauty  – Leni Riefenstahl
 The Hurt Locker  – Kathryn Bigelow
 Le Lit  – Marion Hänsel
 Squandered Sunday  – Drahomíra Vihanová
 The Girls  – Mai Zetterling
 Germany, Pale Mother  – Helma Sanders-Brahms
 Les Filles Du Roy  – Anne Claire Poirier
 Marseille  – Angela Schanelec
 The Loveless  – Kathryn Bigelow, Monty Montgomery
 Anna's Sommer  – Jeanine Meerapfel
 Go! Go! Go!  – Marie Menken
 The Arch  – Cecile Tang

POV
 Proof  – Jocelyn Moorhouse
 The Hitch-Hiker  – Ida Lupino
 The Wayward Girl  – Edith Carlmar
 The Beguiled  – Sofia Coppola
 The Year of the Cannibals  – Liliana Cavani
 Meek's Cutoff  – Kelly Reichardt
 Loving Couples  – Mai Zetterling
 The Ascent  – Larisa Shepitko
 Wings  – Larisa Shepitko
 Strange Days  – Kathryn Bigelow
 The Babadook  – Jennifer Kent
 Fat Girl  – Catherine Breillat

Close Up
 A Real Young Girl  – Catherine Breillat
 Adoption  – Márta Mészáros
 The Cheaters  – Paulette McDonagh
 The 3 Rooms of Melancholia  – Pirjo Honkasalo
 Xiu Xiu: The Sent Down Girl  – Joan Chen
 Madame's Cravings (Madam's Fancies)  – Alice Guy-Blaché
 Evolution  – Lucile Hadžihalilović
 Le Lit  – Marion Hänsel
 Arabesque  – Germaine Dulac
 The Ascent  – Larisa Shepitko

Surrealism and Dreams
 Wayne's World  – Penelope Spheeris
 Three Cases of Murder: "In the Picture"  – Wendy Toye
 36 Chowringhee Lane  – Aparna Sen
 At Land  – Maya Deren
 Meshes of the Afternoon  – Maya Deren
 The Portrait of a Lady  – Jane Campion
 The Gold Diggers  – Sally Potter
 The Arch  – Cecile Tang
 La Pointe Courte  – Agnès Varda
 Germany, Pale Mother  – Helma Sanders-Brahms
 The Attached Balloon  – Binka Zhelyazkova
 Daisies  – Věra Chytilová
 Diary for My Children  – Márta Mészáros
 Evolution  – Lucile Hadžihalilović
 L'Invitation Au Voyage  – Germaine Dulac
 The Black Dog  – Alison de Vere

Bodies
 One Sings, the Other Doesn't  – Agnès Varda
 Chocolate  – Yasmin Ahmad
 Tomboy  – Céline Sciamma
 Fish Tank  – Andrea Arnold
 The Sealed Soil  – Marva Nabili
 Betoniyö  – Pirjo Honkasalo
 Beau Travail  – Claire Denis
 Olympia Part Two: Festival of Beauty  – Leni Riefenstahl
 Mustang  – Deniz Gamze Ergüven
 Ritual in Transfigured Time  – Maya Deren
 The House Is Black  – Forough Farrokhzad
 Oxhide  – Liu Jiayin
 Faces Places  – Agnès Varda
 Olympia Part Two: Festival of Beauty  – Leni Riefenstahl
 The Last Stage  – Wanda Jakubowska
 The Hypocrites  – Lois Weber
 American Psycho  – Mary Harron
 Germany, Pale Mother  – Helma Sanders-Brahms
 The Inheritance  – Márta Mészáros
 Evolution  – Lucile Hadžihalilović

Sex
 Peppermint Soda  – Diane Kurys
 Innocence  – Lucile Hadžihalilović
 But I'm a Cheerleader  – Jamie Babbit
 Mossane  – Safi Faye
 Attenberg  – Athina Rachel Tsangari
 Dogfight  – Nancy Savoca
 Mr Pascal  – Alison de Vere
 American Honey  – Andrea Arnold
 Under the Skin  – Carine Adler
 Le Bonheur  – Agnès Varda
 Invisible Adversaries  – Valie Export
 Desert Hearts  – Donna Deitch
 The Future  – Miranda July
 XXY  – Lucía Puenzo
 Toni Erdmann  – Maren Ade
 La Captive  – Chantal Akerman
 American Psycho  – Mary Harron
 Fat Girl  – Catherine Breillat
 The Diary of a Teenage Girl  – Marielle Heller
 Nothing Bad Can Happen  – Katrin Gebbe
 O Amor Natural  – Heddy Honigmann

Home
 The Wayward Girl  – Edith Carlmar
 The Enchanted Desna  – Yuliya Solntseva
 Ratcatcher  – Lynne Ramsay
 Hedi Schneider Is Stuck  – Sonja Heiss
 Night Games  – Mai Zetterling
 Oxhide II  – Liu Jiayin
 Tailpiece  – Margaret Tait
 The House Is Black  – Forough Farrokhzad
 Safe  – Antonia Bird
 Home  – Ursula Meier
 Story of the Flaming Years  – Yuliya Solntseva
 Homeland of Electricity  – Larisa Shepitko

Religion
 The Hypocrites  – Lois Weber
 Gahanu Lamai (The Girls)  – Sumitra Peries
 Khovanshchina  – Vera Stroyeva
 The Holy Girl  – Lucrecia Martel
 Homeland of Electricity  – Larisa Shepitko
 Priest  – Antonia Bird
 Lourdes  – Jessica Hausner
 Persepolis  – Vincent Paronnaud, Marjane Satrapi

Work
 The Future  – Miranda July
 American Honey  – Andrea Arnold
 Women of Ryazan  – Olga Preobrazhenskaya
 Araya  – Margot Benacerraf
 Homeland of Electricity  – Larisa Shepitko
 Something Different  – Věra Chytilová
 Nana  – Valérie Massadian
 Jeanne Dielman, 23 quai du Commerce, 1080 Bruxelles  – Chantal Akerman
 The Selfish Giant  – Clio Barnard
 Skyscraper  – Shirley Clarke, Willard Van Dyke
 Monster  – Patty Jenkins
 Sherrybaby  – Laurie Collyer
 American Psycho  – Mary Harron
 Devotion: A Film About Ogawa Productions  – Barbara Hammer
 The Brickmakers  – Marta Rodriguez, Jorge Silva
 The Silences of the Palace  – Moufida Tlatli

Politics
 The Enchanted Desna  – Yuliya Solntseva
 In My Skin  – Marina de Van
 The Fall of the Romanov Dynasty  – Esfir Shub
 The Triumph of the Will  – Leni Riefenstahl
 Bhaji on the Beach  – Gurinder Chadha
 What Else Is New? (Digeh che khabar?)  – Tahmineh Milani
 The Prize  – Paula Markovitch
 Tomka and His Friends  – Xhanfize Keko
 Melody for a Street Organ  – Kira Muratova
 Divorce Iranian Style  – Kim Longinotto, Ziba Mir-Hosseini
 Drowned Out  – Franny Armstrong
 Strange Days  – Kathryn Bigelow
 Love Letter  – Kinuyo Tanaka
 Cuba, an African Odyssey  – Jihan El-Tahri
 Finsterworld  – Frauke Finsterwalder
 The Hidden Half  – Tahmineh Milani

Gear Change
 Selma  – Ava DuVernay
 Girlhood  – Céline Sciamma
 Orlando  – Sally Potter
 Milarepa  – Liliana Cavani
 The Asthenic Syndrome  – Kira Muratova
 The Connection  – Shirley Clarke

Comedy
 Jumpin Jack Flash  – Penny Marshall
 Big  – Penny Marshall
 I've Heard the Mermaids Singing  – Patricia Rozema
 Appropriate Behaviour  – Desiree Akhavan
 The Trouble with Angels  – Ida Lupino
 A New Leaf  – Elaine May
 The Heartbreak Kid  – Elaine May
 Obvious Child  – Gillian Robespierre
 But I'm a Cheerleader  – Jamie Babbit
 Fjols til fjells (aka Fools in the Mountains)  – Edith Carlmar
 El Camino  – Ana Mariscal
 Wayne's World  – Penelope Spheeris
 Body  – Małgorzata Szumowska
 Marlina the Murderer in Four Acts  – Mouly Surya
 The Attached Balloon  – Binka Zhelyazkova

Melodrama
 Shoes  – Lois Weber
 Death Is a Caress  – Edith Carlmar
 Chekhov's Motifs  – Kira Muratova
 You and Me  – Larisa Shepitko
 Lowlands (Tiefland)  – Leni Riefenstahl
 A Squandered Sunday  – Drahomíra Vihanová
 We Were Young  – Binka Zhelyazkova
 Love Letter  – Kinuyo Tanaka

Sci-Fi
 The Matrix  – The Wachowskis
 Wonder Woman  – Patty Jenkins
 Jupiter Ascending  – The Wachowskis
 Tank Girl  – Rachel Talalay
 The Handmaid's Tale  – Reed Morano
 Invisible Adversaries  – Valie Export
 My 20th Century  – Ildikó Enyedi

Horror and Hell
 No Exit (Huis-Clos)  – Jacqueline Audry/Britt Pitre
 Ellen  – Mahalia Belo
 Earth  – Deepa Mehta
 The Asthenic Syndrome  – Kira Muratova
 Blackboards  – Samira Makhmalbaf
 Nothing Bad Can Happen  – Katrin Gebbe
 Safe  – Antonia Bird
 NabelFabel  – Mara Mattuschka
 A Girl Walks Home Alone at Night  – Ana Lily Amirpour
 Mossane  – Safi Faye
 We Were Young  – Binka Zhelyazkova
 The Babadook  – Jennifer Kent
 Archipelago  – Joanna Hogg
 Swimmer  – Lynne Ramsay
 The Girl in the River  – Sharmeen Obaid-Chinoy
 The Silences of the Palace  – Moufida Tlatli
 Lore  – Cate Shortland
 Outrage  – Ida Lupino
 No Exit (Huis-Clos)  – Jacqueline Audry/Britt Pitre

Tension
 Demon Lover Diary  – Joel DeMott
 Dreams of a Life  – Carol Morley
 Archipelago  – Joanna Hogg
 Blue Steel  – Kathryn Bigelow
 Hotell  – Lisa Langseth
 Evolution  – Lucile Hadžihalilović
 The Wayward Girl  – Edith Carlmar
 The Peacemaker  – Mimi Leder
 A Question of Silence  – Marleen Gorris
 Selma  – Ava DuVernay
 The Asthenic Syndrome  – Kira Muratova

Stasis
 Places in Cities  – Angela Schanelec
 Brownian Movement  – Nanouk Leopold
 The Asthenic Syndrome  – Kira Muratova
 Terra Firma  – Margaret Tait
 Kid  – Fien Troch
 A Question of Silence  – Marleen Gorris
 Les Rendez-vous d'Anna (The Meetings of Anna)  – Chantal Akerman
 Double Tide  – Sharon Lockhart
 Hamaca Paraguaya (Paraguayan Hammock)  – Paz Encina
 Khamosh Pani (Silent Waters)  – Sabiha Sumar
 Marlina the Murderer in Four Acts  – Mouly Surya

Leave Out
 Chekhov's Motifs  – Kira Muratova
 Je Tu Il Elle  – Chantal Akerman
 Women of Ryazan  – Olga Preobrazhenskaya, Ivan Pravov
 Wadjda  – Haifaa Al-Mansour
 The Sealed Soil  – Marva Nabili
 The Day I'll Never Forget  – Kim Longinotto
 Baxter, Vera Baxter  – Marguerite Duras
 Proof  – Jocelyn Moorhouse
 The Story of the Flaming Years  – Yuliya Solntseva

Reveal
 Westworld  – Lisa Joy, Jonathan Nolan
 After the Tracks (pas gjurmëve)  – Xhanfise Keko
 Morvern Callar  – Lynne Ramsay
 Story of the Flaming Years  – Yuliya Solntseva
 Love Letter  – Kinuyo Tanaka
 Women of Ryazan  – Olga Preobrazhenskaya, Ivan Pravov
 Lourdes  – Jessica Hausner
 Stories We Tell  – Sarah Polley
 The Wonders  – Alice Rohrwacher

Memory
 Elena  – Petra Costa
 The She-Wolf  – Maria Plyta
 Pet Sematary  – Mary Lambert
 Poem of the Sea  – Yuliya Solntseva
 A Time to Die  – Dorota Kędzierzawska
 The Very Late Afternoon of a Faun  – Věra Chytilová
 Loving Couples  – Mai Zetterling
 The Enchanted Desna  – Yuliya Solntseva
 Olympia Part Two: Festival of the Nations  – Leni Riefenstahl
 A Thousand Suns  – Mati Diop
 Return  – Liza Johnson

Time
 Falling Leaves  – Alice Guy-Blaché
 Les Rendez-vous d'Anna (The Meetings of Anna)  – Chantal Akerman
 My 20th Century  – Ildikó Enyedi
 Thumbelina  – Lotte Reiniger
 Monster  – Patty Jenkins
 Something Better to Come  – Hanna Polak
 The Gold Diggers  – Sally Potter
 Ravenous  – Antonia Bird
 Go Go Go  – Marie Menken
 The She-Wolf  – Maria Plyta
 The Future  – Miranda July
 Orlando  – Sally Potter
 The Day I Became a Woman  – Marziyeh Meshkini

Life Inside
 The Seashell and the Clergyman  – Germaine Dulac
 Wings  – Larisa Shepitko
 The Future  – Miranda July
 Bhaji on the Beach  – Gurinder Chadha
 Mikey and Nicky  – Elaine May
 An Angel at my Table  – Jane Campion
 Film About a Woman Who  – Yvonne Rainer
 La Zerda ou les chants de l'oubli (Zerda or the Songs of Forgetting)  – Assia Djebar

The Meaning of Life
 Together  – Lorenza Mazzetti
 Mermaid  – Anna Melikian
 Western  – Valeska Grisebach
 Now I'm Thirteen  – Shin Daewe
 Les Rendez-vous d'Anna (The Meetings of Anna)  – Chantal Akerman
 Betoniyo  – Pirjo Honkasalo
 Woman  – Signe Baumane
 Sugar Cane Alley (Rue Cases Negres)  – Euzhan Palcy
 Digeh Che Khabar? (What Else Is New?)  – Tahmineh Milani

Love
 Sacrificed Youth  – Zhang Nuanxing
 Gahanu Lamai (The Girls)  – Sumitra Peries
 Me and You and Everyone We Know  – Miranda July
 On Body and Soul  – Ildikó Enyedi
 Tales  – Rakhshān Banietemad
 The Piano  – Jane Campion
 Where I Am Is Here  – Margaret Tait
 The Intruder  – Claire Denis
 An Education  – Lone Scherfig
 The Wayward Girl  – Edith Carlmar
 Treeless Mountain  – So Yong Kim
 Mon Roi  – Maïwenn
 Mustang  – Deniz Gamze Ergüven
 The Widow  – Park Nam-ok 
 A Simple Life  – Ann Hui
 Heart of a Dog  – Laurie Anderson

Death
 Eternal Breasts  – Kinuyo Tanaka
 The East Is Red  – Wang Ping
 The Attached Balloon  – Binka Zhelyazkova
 Le Lit  – Marion Hänsel
 Hateship, Loveship  – Liza Johnson
 The Street  – Caroline Leaf
 Crulic: The Path to Beyond  – Anca Damian
 El Camino  – Ana Mariscal
 Sworn Virgin  – Laura Bispuri
 The Selfish Giant  – Clio Barnard
 Tonio  – Paula van der Oest
 A Time to Die  – Dorota Kędzierzawska

Endings
 Hotel Very Welcome  – Sonja Heiss
 Homeland of Electricity  – Larisa Shepitko
 Gahanu Lamai (The Girls)  – Sumitra Peries
 Love Letter  – Kinuyo Tanaka
 Hard, Fast and Beautiful!  – Ida Lupino
 Born in Flames  – Lizzie Borden
 35 Shots of Rum  – Claire Denis
 Ritual in Transfigured Time  – Maya Deren

Song and Dance
 Woman Demon Human – Shuqin Huang
 Boris Godunov – Vera Stroyeva
 John Macfadyen – Margaret Tait
 The Irresistible Piano – Alice Guy-Blaché
 Le Lit – Marion Hänsel
 Elena – Petra Costa
 Aldri annet enn bråk (aka Nothing but Trouble) – Edith Carlmar
 Longing – Valeska Grisebach
 Girlhood – Céline Sciamma
 The Drunkard (O Ébrio) – Gilda de Abreu
 Crossing Delancey – Joan Micklin Silver
 Sambizanga – Sarah Maldoror
 The Connection – Shirley Clarke
 Le Bonheur – Agnès Varda
 Dance, Girl, Dance – Dorothy Arzner, Roy Del Ruth
 L'Une Chant (One Sings, the Other Doesn't) – Agnès Varda
 Attenberg – Athina Rachel Tsangari
 Lemonade – Beyoncé Knowles, Kahlil Joseph

References

External links

2018 films
Films directed by Mark Cousins
Documentary films about women in film
British documentary films
2010s British films